Patrick Donnelly (born September 25, 1956 in Tucson, Arizona) is an American poet. He is the author of four poetry collections, The Charge (Ausable Press, 2003, which in 2009 became part of Copper Canyon Press) Nocturnes of the Brothel of Ruin (Four Way Books, 2012), Jesus Said (a chapbook from Orison Books, 2017), and Little-Known Operas (Four Way Books, 2019). His poems have appeared in many journals, including The American Poetry Review, The Yale Review, The Virginia Quarterly Review, The Massachusetts Review, Ploughshares, Hayden's Ferry Review, and Slate, and in anthologies including The Book of Irish American Poetry from the 18th Century to the Present (University of Notre Dame Press, 2007), and From the Fishouse: An Anthology of Poems that Sing, Rhyme, Resound, Syncopate, Alliterate, and Just Plain Sound Great (Persea Press, 2009).

Though not of any specific religion, his poetry often takes on subjects such as erotic love or the AIDS epidemic in religious terms. Writing in 88: A Journal of Contemporary Poetry, Lee Rossi said of Donnelly's work: "Donnelly's greatest strength may be his control of the pitch and inflection of his poems. We see it not just in the let's-go-to-bed poems, but also in the poems of suffering and loss...The poet is not just some rueful roué, but something more complicated and human. Caught between God and God's creation, he is the anchorite who never completely turns his back on this world, the angelic sybarite who never quite quits his conversation with God."[1]

Donnelly is director of the Poetry Seminar at The Frost Place in Franconia, New Hampshire, and will be teaching for the Seminar in August, 2021. [2]He is currently an associate editor of Poetry International and a contributing editor of Trans-Portal, and from 1999 to 2009 he was an associate editor at Four Way Books. He received his MFA from the Warren Wilson College MFA Program for Writers, and has taught at Smith College, Colby College, the Lesley University MFA in Creative Writing Program, and Lynchburg College. Donnelly's awards include a U.S./Japan Creative Artists Program Award, an Artist Fellowship from the Massachusetts Cultural Council, the Margaret Bridgman Fellowship in Poetry from the Bread Loaf Writers' Conference, and a 2018 Amy Clampitt Residency Award.

With his spouse Stephen D. Miller, Donnelly translated classical Japanese poems in The Wind from Vulture Peak: the Buddhification of Japanese Waka in the Heian Period (Cornell East Asia Series, 2012). The Vulture Peak translations were awarded the 2015-2016 Japan-U.S. Friendship Commission Prize for the Translation of Japanese Literature, from the Donald Keene Center of Japanese Culture at Columbia University. Donnelly's translations with Miller have appeared in many journals, including Bateau, Circumference, eXchanges, Inquiring Mind, Metamorphoses, New Plains Review, and Poetry International.[4]

Donnelly was the 2015 – 2017 Poet Laureate of Northampton, Massachusetts.

Works 
 The Charge. Ausable Press (since 2009 part of Copper Canyon Press). 2003.
 Nocturnes of the Brothel of Ruin. Four Way Books. 2012.
 Jesus Said. Orison Books. 2017.
 Little-Known Operas. Four Way Books. 2019.

References

 Ploughshares > Authors & Articles
 Copper Canyon Press > Author Page
 Editor page > Trans-Portal

External links 
 Orison Books
 U.S./Japan Creative Artists Program Award
 Artist Fellowship from the Massachusetts Cultural Council
 Margaret Bridgman Fellowship in Poetry from the Bread Loaf Writers' Conference
 2018 Amy Clampitt Residency Award
 2015-2016 Japan-U.S. Friendship Commission Prize for the Translation of Japanese Literature
 2015 – 2017 Poet Laureate of Northampton, Massachusetts
 Poem > American Poetry Review > Read the Signs
 Poem > American Poetry Review > Prayer at the Gym
 Poem > American Poetry Review > Cradle-Song
Poem > Barrow Street > After a Move
 Translations > Inquiring Mind > Patrick Donnelly and Stephen D. Miller
 Translations > Mead > Patrick Donnelly and Stephen D. Miller
 Translations > Cha: an Asian Literary Journal > Patrick Donnelly and Stephen D. Miller
From the Fishouse > audio archive > Patrick Donnelly

1956 births
Living people
Writers from Tucson, Arizona
American male poets
American gay writers
American LGBT poets
Poets from Arizona
Municipal Poets Laureate in the United States
Gay poets